Lieutenant-General Harry Mordaunt (29 March 1663 – 4 January 1720) was an English Army officer and Whig politician who sat in the English and British House of Commons between 1692 and 1720.

Early life
Mordaunt was born at Parsons Green, Fulham, a younger son of John Mordaunt, 1st Viscount Mordaunt and his wife Elizabeth Carey. She was the daughter and sole heiress of Thomas Carey, who was the second son of Robert Carey, 1st Earl of Monmouth.

Mordaunt was educated at Middle Temple from 1674 and Westminster School from 1676. He matriculated at Christ Church, Oxford on 17 December 1680, aged 17 and was awarded BA in 1684. Mordaunt married, firstly, Margaret Spencer, natural daughter of Sir Thomas Spencer, 3rd Baronet.  He later married Penelope Tipping, the daughter of William Tipping of West Court at Ewelme in Oxfordshire by his wife, Elizabeth Collet. She was the niece of Sir Thomas Tipping, 1st Baronet.

Army career
Mordaunt joined the army and was an ensign by 1689 and captain of the 1st Dragoon Guards by 1693. In April 1694, he was appointed colonel of a regiment of foot, known by his name, which was converted to a marine regiment on 13 July 1698 and disbanded on 20 May 1699. Mordaunt was commander-in-chief at Guernsey in 1697 and 1702. Another regiment of marines was raised under his colonelcy on 10 March 1702, which was converted to infantry in May 1703 and disbanded in July 1713. Mordaunt became brigadier-general in 1704, major-general in 1706 and lieutenant-general in 1709.

Political career
Mordaunt was returned as Member of Parliament for Brackley at a by-election on 2 January 1692 and was returned unopposed at the 1695 English general election. He was defeated in a contest at the 1698 English general election. In 1698, Mordaunt was appointed Conservator of the Forest of Dean until 1712. From 1699 to June 1702, he was Treasurer of Ordnance. He was returned unopposed for Brackley at the two general elections of 1701 but was defeated at the 1702 English general election. He was returned again for Brackley at a by-election on 16 November 1705. Mordaunt was Treasurer of the Ordnance again from 1705 to 1712. At the 1708 British general election he transferred to Richmond, Yorkshire and was returned as MP for the borough. Mordaunt was returned at Richmond unopposed at the 1710 British general election, but at the 1713 British general election he was returned in a contest. He served a third term as Treasurer of the Ordnance from December 1714 until his death. At the 1715 British general election Mordaunt was again returned as Whig MP for Richmond by his cousin, Lord Wharton.

Death and legacy
Mordaunt died on 4 January 1720. By his first wife he had children, including:
General Sir John Mordaunt, best known for leading the failed Raid on Rochefort in 1757
Thomas Mordaunt (died 1721)
Elizabeth Lucy Mordaunt (died 1765), married Sir Wilfrid Lawson, 3rd Baronet on 14 March 1724.
By his second wife he had a single daughter:
Penelope, married Sir Monoux Cope, 7th Baronet of Bramshill House in Hampshire

References

1663 births
1720 deaths
British Army generals
Members of the Parliament of Great Britain for English constituencies
British MPs 1707–1708
British MPs 1708–1710
British MPs 1710–1713
British MPs 1713–1715
British MPs 1715–1722
Younger sons of viscounts
English MPs 1690–1695
English MPs 1695–1698
English MPs 1701
English MPs 1701–1702
English MPs 1705–1707